Mourya Sawant (died 1912) was a Hindu Ranes leader who led a revolt against Portuguese in 1912. 

Mourya Sawant led an unsuccessful Goan Hindu revolt against Portuguese colonialism. He was decapitated whilst asleep at his home. Portuguese troops entered his home secretly, and stabbed him and beheaded him. His colleague, Jhil Sawant, was caught when Mourya was beheaded.

The Portuguese ruled over Goa for nearly four hundred years. They ruled Goa with a high degree of repression, and converted Hindus to Catholicism by force. Many Hindus fled to neighboring territories.

References

Further reading

People executed by Portugal by decapitation
Marathi people
Hindu martyrs
History of Goa
20th-century executions by Portugal